There are currently eighteen episodes of Pure Pwnage the web series and eight episodes of a TV series commissioned by Showcase. All the episodes from the original web series are available for streaming on the official Pure Pwnage website. User-contributed subtitles are available in over 30 languages and counting.

Series overview 
{| class="wikitable" style="text-align:center"
|-
! style="padding: 0px 8px" colspan="2" rowspan="2"| Season
! style="padding: 0px 8px" rowspan="2"| Episodes
! colspan="2"| Originally aired
! style="padding: 0px 8px" rowspan="2"| DVD release date
|-
! style="padding: 0px 8px"| Season premiere
! Season finale
|-
! colspan="6"| Web series
|-
 |bgcolor="#B60000"|
 |[[List of Pure Pwnage episodes#Season 1 (2004–06)|1]]
 |12
 |
 |style="padding: 0px 8px"| 
 |May 23, 2007 
|-
 |bgcolor="#8888FF"|
 |[[List of Pure Pwnage episodes#Season 2 (2007–08)|2]]
 |6
 |
 |
 |
|-
! colspan="6"| Television series
 |-
 |bgcolor="#01645C"|
 |[[List of Pure Pwnage episodes#Season 1 (2010)|1]]
 |8
 |
 |
 |March 3, 2011 (Region 4)April 16, 2011  (Worldwide)
|}

Web series

Season 1 (2004–06) 
The first season was released between 2004 and 2006. Twelve episodes were released at irregular intervals online, and are still available for streaming on the official website. The later episodes had premiere screenings. The first season is available on a 4 disc DVD box set, which includes all 12 episodes in DVD quality, commentary tracks, subtitles in 12 languages, cast interviews, bloopers, outtakes, extra scenes, E3 Special and more.
{| class="wikitable plainrowheaders" width="100%" style="margin-right: 0;"
|-
! style="background-color: #B60000; color: #ffffff;"| #
! style="background-color: #B60000; color: #ffffff;"| #
! style="background-color: #B60000; color: #ffffff;"| Title
! style="background-color: #B60000; color: #ffffff;"| Directed by
! style="background-color: #B60000; color: #ffffff;"| Written by
! style="background-color: #B60000; color: #ffffff;"| Original release date
! style="background-color: #B60000; color: #ffffff;"| Running time
|-

 

{{Episode list
 |EpisodeNumber = 11
 |EpisodeNumber2 = 11
 |Title = i <3 u in rl
 |DirectedBy = Geoff Lapaire
 |WrittenBy = Geoff Lapaire & Jarett Cale
 |OriginalAirDate =  (Live Screening) (Online)
 |Aux4 = 21:36
 |ShortSummary = After reconciling, Jeremy and Anastasia spend most of their time together playing separate games in Jeremy's apartment. Later, en route to meeting Doug, Jeremy must flee from a group of enthusiastic Pure Pwnage fans. Doug reveals that he is carrying his Sega Master Light Phaser, and displays that it is functional in RL. Suddenly, Teh_Masterer calls Jeremy from a nearby pay phone, telling him to go to the Netherlands.
Immediately, the scene switches to a council of mysterious people who discuss Teh_Masterer's training scheme.
Jeremy and Kyle visit the Netherlands using the money from the eBay auction of Jeremy's hair, where Jeremy engages in more micro training. This dangerous trip infuriates Jeremy, but pleases Teh_Masterer. An unrelated footage follows the episode where Jeremy makes fun of sheep by imitating "lol" (pronounced "lawl") like a sheep at forum user Skrie'''s farm.
 |LineColor = B60000
}}

|}

 Season 2 (2007–08) 
The second season was released between 2007 and 2008, with 6 episodes currently released. The second season was put on hold due to the death of cast member Troy Dixon (T-Bag). In January 2011, a forum post by Jarett Cale explained, "After struggling to continue the web series myself, I've now placed it on indefinite hold. While this doesn't mean it's officially 'dead', that is unfortunately the most likely outcome."

 Featurettes 
Various Pure Pwnage shorts/featurettes can be found on the official website by clicking the "Shorts" menu tab.

 Television series 

 Season 1 (2010) 
On August 6, 2009 it was announced that a Pure Pwnage'' TV series had been commissioned by Showcase. All cast members from the web series return for the TV series with the exceptions of Dave Lee (Dave) and Miranda Plant (Anastasia). The TV series sees the addition of new cast member Melanie Scrofano, who plays October. Ten production blog web shorts were released online prior to the show's premiere on television. The show airs on Friday at 10:30 pm ET/PT (previously 10:00 pm) on Showcase. It has now been distributed internationally in countries such as the United States and Australia.

See also 
 List of Pure Pwnage characters
 Web series

References

External links 
 
 Pure Pwnage web episodes
 Pure Pwnage episodes at Showcase.ca

Pure Pwnage